The MegaFlyover project was a seven-month aerial survey from June 2004 to January 2005 by explorer/ecologist J. Michael Fay and pilot Peter Ragg sponsored by the National Geographic Society and others.  They criss-crossed Africa from South Africa to Morocco in a modified Cessna 182, logging 60,000 miles (about 100,000 kilometers) and taking more than 100,000 high-resolution digital GPS-marked images shot from low altitude (every 20 seconds).

It was partly inspired by Mike's earlier MegaTransect expedition in 1999.

Five hundred of these images have been added to Google Earth's database.

Notes

External links
 National Geographic web site about MegaFlyover
 NPR article
 Wildlife Conservation Society introduction to the Megaflyover

Scientific observation
Environmental science
Photographic collections and books
21st century in Africa
Aerial photography